Maisie Maxwell  (October 8, 1876 – July 24, 1977) was an Australian stage actress and journalist born in Bendigo (then known as Sandhurst), Victoria.

Maxwell was awarded the British Empire Medal in 1969 for journalism. May Maxwell Crescent, in the Canberra suburb of Gilmore, is named in her honour.

References

External links 
  Maisie Maxwell at the Melbourne Press Club Hall of Fame
 Maxwell, May (Maisie) at The Australian Women's Register

20th-century Australian actresses
20th-century Australian journalists
Australian women journalists
Australian silent film actresses
1876 births
1977 deaths
Actresses from Victoria (Australia)
Journalists from Victoria (Australia)
People from Bendigo
Australian recipients of the British Empire Medal